Christopher James "Kit" Fagan (born 5 June 1950) is a retired English footballer who played as a central defender in the Football League for Liverpool and Tranmere Rovers, and in the North American Soccer League for Philadelphia Atoms. He is the son of former Liverpool manager Joe Fagan.

References

1950 births
Living people
Footballers from Manchester
Association football central defenders
English footballers
Liverpool F.C. players
Tranmere Rovers F.C. players
Philadelphia Atoms players
Bangor City F.C. players
English Football League players
North American Soccer League (1968–1984) players
English expatriate sportspeople in the United States
Expatriate soccer players in the United States
English expatriate footballers